Eugene Tssui (  born Eugene Tsui, September 14, 1954) is an American architect noted for his use of ecological principles and "biologic" design, a term coined by Tssui himself in the 2010 issue of World Architecture Review. He has proposed a number of projects such as a bridge across the Strait of Gibraltar to connect the continents of Africa and Europe as well as a 2-mile-high tower capable of housing 1 million residents.
He has been called the "Seminal Architect of the 21st Century."  In May of 2013, Tssui was also listed as one of one hundred "Guardian Angels of the Planet" by Project Coyote.

Biography

Tssui was born in Cleveland, Ohio, the child of Chinese immigrants, and raised in Minneapolis, Minnesota. Despite the encouragement of his friends and family to pursue medicine, and a wide variety of interests in his youth (including piano and drum playing, martial arts, and flamenco dance), Tssui decided to pursue architecture. After working in numerous offices and institutions, including the Organizing Committee of the 1976 Montreal Summer Olympics, he was accepted at Columbia University's Graduate School of Design, based on his professional work in architecture offices.  His unconventional designs did not match the expectations of the university, and he left to be apprenticed under architect Bruce Goff instead. He later received a bachelor of architecture from the University of Oregon, along with graduate studies at the University of California, Berkeley, where he earned two masters and a doctorate. Tssui specializes in nature influenced architecture, preferring shapes and forms inspired by living creatures and natural constructions to standard rectilinear designs. He has won numerous scholarships and grants for his work in architecture, including those from the Graham Foundation and the National Endowment for the Arts.

Apart from his work in architecture, Tssui has pursued assorted other areas of interest. His efforts in design extend out to clothing and furniture, and often reflect similar concerns about movement, weight, and sustainability as appear in his architectural designs. He also pursued a number of athletic endeavors. The most notable titles to his name include the super middleweight boxing title in the 2005 Ringside World Championships, the world's largest amateur boxing tournament, and the Presidential Sports Award, both of which he won eight times. He is also a four-time Senior Olympics Gymnastics All-Around Champion.

Tssui is married to sociologist and educator Elisabeth P. Montgomery, Ph.D., who works in China as a school superintendent.

Philosophy and style

Tssui believes nature to be an incomparable educator, with knowledge of design and construction borne of the necessary adaptation to constantly evolving systems. Exploring the hows and whys of nature's workings, and looking at the active and reactive relationships of organisms with the surroundings are some of the driving forces behind Tssui's designs. According to Tssui, humans are students of nature, who is the educator. In order to create efficient and sustainable living spaces and lifestyles, architecture must draw from nature to achieve the optimum solution to a given problem. Tssui searches for design elements that work to place the responsibility of environmental and human health back into the daily conscience and behaviors of human life. This outlook must then be expressed in the building's spaces, both interior and exterior, as well as in the detailing and relationship with the site.  Tssui also underlines the desire to create responsive buildings which not only work in tandem with and prevent further damage to the environment but also restore damage that has already been done.

From this philosophy, Tssui's work derives a biomimetic aspect, which he initially discussed in terms of evolutionary architecture and has in more recent years begun to refer to as biologic design. Deriving from the Latin bio, meaning alive or natural, and logic, meaning well-reasoned, Tssui's conception of biologic architecture asks the question "What would nature do given this context, requirements, and functional goals?" The goal of this approach is to make buildings that take into account challenges of the environment and apply the "knowledge" exemplified by other natural organisms inhabiting the site—in this way preparing for the environment, and ultimately deflect normally disastrous calamities. Some key aspects of Tssui's biologic design include:
structures that take into account the surrounding area, including materials on-hand and challenges presented by the environment
high strength-to-weight ratios, structures strong in tension and compression
aero/hydrodynamic shapes which distribute and relieve stress on the structure and minimize materials needed to build
interior design that encourages exercise, health, and fitness
efficient ventilation, insulation, and temperature control systems that depend on natural circulation
endurance to weather and other environmental changes
using non-imported materials for construction
production of structures whose exterior design and interior workings create no adverse effects on the environment
From these aspects of design, the resulting architecture works in tandem with the environment, drawing inspiration from the ecosystems around the structure to produce a sustainable and adapted building. As a result of these tenets, Tssui derives a distinctive style of architecture which makes use of curvilinear forms, sails, "wings," egg-and-sphere-shaped structures, closing wall and roof systems, and other elements which are highly reflective of the natural world. Those who have lived in Tssui's spaces have spoken of the design exuding "freedom and energy," and ultimately encouraging creativity.

Built projects

Tssui's built designs include the Watsu School at Harbin Hot Springs ("a series of five spherical buildings connected by a string of hallways and surrounded by a trough of cooling water"), his firm's headquarters in Emeryville, and several residential homes embodying his ecological principles.

Headquarters for Tssui's company, Tsui Design and Research Inc., began development in 1991 and its final phase of construction completed in 1998; the design utilized recycled materials for manufacturing, and was built with energy conservation in mind.  The now defunct office building was subsequently sold in 2007 and demolished, as it was deemed "too unusual to rent."
His design for his parents' house in Berkeley, California, is known for its unusual round shape and its structural concept.  The home, sometimes called "Ojo del Sol" ("Eye of the Sun"), is also known as the "Fish House" and, according to Tssui, is based on the anatomy of a tardigrade.  The materials used in making the Ojo del Sol include inexpensive and recycled materials that draw inspiration from the Cholla cactus, which is virtually fireproof. Tssui designed the house with the goal of making it the "safest house in the world," intended to survive fires, earthquakes, flooding, and termites.<ref>Michelle Locke, "Love It or Loathe It: Berkeley Architect's Design a Sea Change in Housing". Associated Press in Los Angeles Times, March 12, 1995.</ref>
Tssui also designed a zero-energy dwelling, known as the ZED Residence, located in the foothills of Mount Shasta, California. The geodesic dome maximizes the "strength-to-weight" ratio found in many super-strong objects and dissipates forces from wind, earthquakes, and tsunamis. Other projects include his showcase building in Shenzhen, China, known as the Ecological House of the Future. He is also the designer behind the Reyes Residence in Oakland, California, which is notable for its dragonfly-like roof ventilation "wings."

Proposals and city planning projects
 The DNA Tower combines business and government offices with vertical gardens to grow food, windmills, and stairwells that act as ventilation. 
 The Eye-in-the-Sky Lookout Tower was once designed to be both the tallest tower and greatest renewable energy project worldwide.  Measuring 2,340 feet high (710 m), it will be 2 times the height of the Paris France's Eiffel Tower or, similarly, over 3 times the height of Seattle Washington's Space Needle, if built.  The viewing deck at the top of the twisting, helix-shaped incline tower would be 5-stories tall with sweeping views for hundreds of miles in every direction, weather permitting.  Two additional structures at its base (the "Crystal Exhibition Hall" and the "Globe" which includes a waterfall) were planned with organic food-based restaurants, educational/exhibition halls, and auditoriums for public and private events in mind.  Outdoor plazas also afforded live music and movies to the anticipated 10 million tourists the Eye-in-the-Sky was anticipated to draw annually.  Equipped with 92 eggbeater wind turbines and 700,000 sq. feet of photovoltaic solar panels, it would generate enough energy to sustain itself and provide the city of Oakland, California, where it had been proposed, with one-fourth of its power needs.  It had also been proposed to the city of Shenzhen, China, and carried a price tag of $600 million dollars to build for either at the time, yet estimated to generate $400 million dollars in revenue annually.  To note, in Oakland, the base of the tower would be "two square (city) blocks" in size while in Shenzhen, it would be built on an artificial island in the center of the bay.  There, surrounded by mangrove trees, windmills would aid in filtering the polluted waters of the city while continuing to consider the health of the environment and local ecology.Eliza Strickland, "Eugene Tsui Says It's Time for Thinking Big. How big? The Emeryville architect proposed a 2,340-foot tower for Oakland and a two-mile-high structure that could house all of San Francisco." East Bay Express, June 2, 2008.

Planned for the coast of Florida, the Floating Sea City would be capable of traveling along the coastlines of major continents and have the ability to grow its own food. The sea city is designed with an open bay area and residential neighborhoods accessible by boat or plane. A curved mountain region at the front end of the city will act as a massive concussion-absorbing block to mitigate the destructive forces of tidal waves. Twenty-seven underwater propulsion jets will be powered by propane gas or methane gas and electricity generated by windmills on the surface. The Trilobite shape of the city will minimize drag-effect through the water. The entire city will be able to pivot to face tidal waves head-on with little or no damage. This city design is currently waiting for funding from a client in Florida to begin further design development and construction.

 The Strait of Gibraltar Floating Bridge, which is intended to span  in length, includes a floating island replete with business and leisure centers at its midpoint. Equipped with wind-powered and underwater turbines, it is capable of powering most of Morocco and southern Spain. At 24 lanes wide and a price tag of $10 billion, the nicknamed "Afro-tunnel" would connect the continents of Europe and Africa. Its segmented design, reminiscent of a vertebral column, would be partially submerged to a depth of 650 feet to allow the continued use of the Strait of Gibraltar for shipping and commerce.Jon Clarke and Colin Freeman, "'Afro-tunnel' may still be a bridge too far", The Sunday Telegraph, April 30, 2006.

 Telos Window of the World, a 12,000-square-foot two-story guitar-shaped residence. The project was approved by the Planning Department of the city of San Pablo. The construction budget was $650,000 with a suggested plan of completion for February 2015.

 The Tourist Village in Guizhou, China, is a $14 million project dedicated to assisting the indigenous people of the area, the Yao, in the cultivation and maintenance of their traditions and values.  While offering a revolutionary type of lifestyle for its proposed 35,000 occupants, the ecologically conscious city would tether traditional views to their modern counterparts.  By creating a new type of township in which successive generations would have no need to seek economic opportunities away from their home, a stabilizing effect on the society would ensue.  The Yao, in a departure from modern technology, deliberately avoid using such things as motorcars and cellular telephones.  The proposed city's architecture is not only reflective of their choices and practices but also incorporates the local folklore and art.  Buildings (like schools and museums) would mimic spider webs in appearance and chimneys (resembling water buffalo horns) can ventilate and cool them naturally.  Novel water collection systems via rooftops also contribute to the nature-inspired collective.  In totality, the village functions without the use of motorized/mechanical or electrical power in order to maintain the respect of native ideology.  The development is anticipated to draw visitors from around the globe, designating the area a cultural and economic zone by the Chinese government.

 The Two-mile High Ultima Tower is a structure of over 500 floors that would house one million people.  Inspired by the termite nest in both form and function, this skyscrapers tensile structure has a "spine" with a hollow, mirrored center, to provide sunlight for plant growth.  The entire building is suspended like a giant maypole and flexes under the stresses and strains of nature.  Each of the twelve levels, open to the elements, affords its occupants a recreational ecosystem with forests, rivers, lakes, hillsides, and wildlife including birds.  By incorporating photovoltaic cells and windmills into the design, energy is readily and organically created to sustain the needs of the inhabitants.  Composting toilets and natural water-reclamation systems aid in maintaining a balanced ecology.  Its price tag of $150 billion offers a "vertical solution" to the ongoing real-world issue of overpopulation.

 Tssui is proposing an underground commercial building for construction on Spring Hill Drive in Mount Shasta, California.  The structure, composed of wood and GigaCrete and having NO HVAC (heating, ventilation, and air conditioning) system, may be the world's first of its kind with a "true zero footprint."  Electricity is human generated and backed-up by silent "Aerotecture" windmills to battery storage.  A "Lifestraw" water catchment system and sawdust toilets are additional features of this structure that are meant to "do no harm" to the planet.  A presentation of this structure was delivered at the Mount Shasta City Park Dance Hall in 2019.

Teaching

Tssui has worked in professorial duties and as a lecturer at a number of schools and universities, including: 
 UC Berkeley as a Senior Lecturer
 Harvard University as a research scholar
 Ohio University as a Thomas Ewing Visiting Professor
 North Carolina State University as the 2002-2003 Harrelson Lecturer
 Harbin University Xili Graduate Campus as a Special Foreign Professor of Architecture
 Peking University Graduate School of Environment and Energy in Shenzhen, China
 South China University of Technology in Guangzhou, China
 San Francisco Institute of Architecture as SFIA instructor
 Shenzhen Yucai High School in Shenzhen, China, as Design & Innovation Advisor

Clothing, fine art, and furniture design

Tssui's clothing designs include prototypes with sequin-like solar panels which would allow the wearer to charge and power their personal electronic devices. The designs have appeared in magazines such as Mondo 2000 and Hyphen. The 2008 Winter cover of the magazine Hors Ligne also features one of his garments.

His work is described as "moving architectural clothing" and reflects the biologic principles found in his architecture, in that his designs are meant to adapt to the wearer's physical activity as well as protect from the elements. Some of the stylistic influence of his architecture also bleeds over into his fashions, with ridges, spines, and wings all featuring in his designs.

In his furniture design, Tssui uses principals of maximum strength using the least amount of materials: similar principles which are found in his biologic style of architecture.

Media appearances

Tssui was the subject of the film TELOS: The Fantastic World of Eugene Tssui, which premiered at the Architecture and Design Film Festival in Los Angeles on March 13, 2014. The film held screenings at various locations in the United States as well as abroad.

A new feature documentary is in production  about Tssui's life story called "Man Beyond Time," directed by Laurent le Gall.  

Additionally, Tssui has appeared on various television channels, including PBS, the Discovery Channel, CTV News Channel and Asian television channels CCTV and SinoVision. A number of short films have featured him and his work as a subject, including "Nature's Blueprints." Tssui has also contributed to a number of short films, including "S.A.C.E.Y./SAFE PLACE ALTERNATIVE" and "Time To Save the Wolves," for which he composed the piano music.

He has also been featured on radio and has interviewed with Jack Foley.

Bibliography

Books and periodicals
 Evolutionary Architecture:  Nature As A Basis For Design (Wiley and Sons, 1999 ) This book features a foreword by Louis L. Marines, who was president of the American Institute of Architects, and an introduction by Tssui's mentor, Bruce Goff.
 The Urgency of Change (China Building and Construction Press, 2002 )
 The Architecture of Eugene Tsui
 Learning from Nature Before it's too Late
 Nature Leads Us to the Future:  Leave No Trace
 Beyond Green Building: Transformation of Design and Human Behavior (China Science Publishing and Media, Ltd. 2015 )
 Sustainable Development (World Architecture Review magazine, January, 2000)
 Improving the world through Biomimicry'' (Taylor Francis Online, October 2022)

Other
 Eugene Tsui, Architectural Drawings Print Portfolio (1990)
 Evolutionary Architecture:  The Drawings and Plans of Eugene Tsui 1992 (Pomegranate Calendars and Books, 1992)
 Evolutionary Architecture:  The Drawings and Plans of Eugene Tsui 1993 (Pomegranate Calendars and Books, 1993)

References

External links
Tsui Design and Research
Eugene Tssui Lecture Series.
TELOS: The Fantastic World of Eugene Tssui
Project Telos: Aligning with the Genius of Nature to Change the World
Design for two mile high "Ultima Tower"

Living people
1954 births
20th-century American architects
Architects from Cleveland
Organic architecture
People from the San Francisco Bay Area
University of California, Berkeley alumni
University of Oregon alumni
21st-century American architects